The 1971–72 Bulgarian Cup was the 32nd season of the Bulgarian Cup (in this period the tournament was named Cup of the Soviet Army). CSKA Sofia won the competition, beating Slavia Sofia 3–0 in the final at the Vasil Levski National Stadium.

Preliminary round

|-
!colspan=3 style="background-color:#D0F0C0;" |1971

|}

First round

|-
!colspan=3 style="background-color:#D0F0C0;" |22 December 1971

|}

Group stage

Group 1
Matches were played in Petrich, Sandanski, Blagoevgrad and Gotse Delchev

|-
!colspan=3 style="background-color:#D0F0C0;" |19–27 February 1972

|}

Group 2
Matches were played in Haskovo, Dimitrovgrad and Harmanli

|-
!colspan=3 style="background-color:#D0F0C0;" |19–27 February 1972

|}

Group 3
Matches were played in Stamboliyski, Velingrad, Pazardzhik and Panagyurishte

|-
!colspan=3 style="background-color:#D0F0C0;" |19–27 February 1972

|}

Group 4
Matches were played in Chirpan, Nova Zagora, Stara Zagora and Radnevo

|-
!colspan=3 style="background-color:#D0F0C0;" |19–27 February 1972

|}

Quarter-finals

Semi-finals

|-
!colspan=4 style="background-color:#D0F0C0;" |28–29 June 1972

Final

Details

References

1971-72
1971–72 domestic association football cups
Cup